Richard Schwartz (born  1959) is an American politician who has worked with former New York City Mayors Rudy Giuliani, Ed Koch and David Dinkins as well as Henry Stern during his tenure as New York City Parks Commissioner and while he was a member of the New York City Council. During the 1980s, he contributed to the New York City Parks restoration. Schwartz authored the Work Experience Program, a welfare reform program. Schwartz founded Opportunity America, a job matching service for welfare recipients, one day after leaving public service in 1997.

Later career
In 2000, Schwartz cofounded clicksafe.com, a porn filter that was approved by the Archdiocese of New York.  The app blocked sites belonging to law scholar and Child Online Protection Act (COPA) testifier Lawrence Lessig's, various pages on the COPA website, the Center for Democracy and Technology, ACLU, Electronic Frontier Foundation, and the American Family Association. It was apparently out of business by 2005.

Despite no journalistic experience, Schwartz became the Editorial Editor at the New York Daily News in the 2000s.

Clearview AI's Hoan Ton-That and Schwartz met at the Manhattan Institute. Schwartz joined Clearview AI after that.

References

Living people
Columbia University alumni
New York University alumni
Year of birth missing (living people)